The Hewlett-Packard 9100A (hp 9100A) is an early programmable calculator (or computer), first appearing in 1968. HP called it a desktop calculator because, as Bill Hewlett said, "If we had called it a computer, it would have been rejected by our customers' computer gurus because it didn't look like an IBM. We therefore decided to call it a calculator, and all such nonsense disappeared."

An ad for the 9100A in 1968 Science magazine contains one of the earliest documented use (as of 2000) of the phrase personal computer.

History 

The unit was descended from a prototype produced by engineer Thomas "Tom" E. Osborne, who joined the company when HP decided to adopt the project.

An engineering triumph at the time, the  logic circuit was produced without any integrated circuits, the assembly of the  CPU having been entirely executed in  discrete components.

The 9100A was the first scientific calculator by the modern definition, i.e., capable of trigonometric, logarithmic (log/ln), and exponential functions, and was the beginning of Hewlett-Packard's long history of using Reverse Polish notation (RPN) entry on their calculators.

See also 
HP-35
CORDIC

References

External links 
  Hosted at the Computer History Museum.
 
 
 Steven Leibson interview of Tom Osborne

9100a